Karl Helmer Alexandersson (16 November 1886 – 24 December 1927), was a Swedish composer and violinist. He was the brother of the actress Karin Alexandersson.

Biography 
Alexandersson was born in Stockholm, where he attended the Royal College of Music before studying the violin under Johan Lindberg, counterpoint under Johan Lindegren, and instrumentation under Jean Paul Ertel in Berlin. His musical career had a promising beginning: he received several scholarships, and he was commissioned to write the official march of the Olympic Games in Stockholm 1912. His second symphony, premièred by George Schnéevoigt in 1919, was a success. After writing orchestral music for several Swedish films he devoted more of his time to writing music for silent films, and he played in person, along with, among others, Hilding Rosenberg in the orchestra pit at the Red Mill cinema in Stockholm. He died in poverty in 1927, and the funeral was funded by the city.

Compositions 
Film music
1919 – Herr Arnes pengar
1923 – "Gunnar Hedes saga"
1925 – Ingmarsarvet 
Arrangement
1921 – "Värmlänningarna"
Orchestral Music
1910 – Overture in C Minor
1919 – Symphony No. 2 in G Minor

Recordings 
Overture, Symphony No. 2, Uppsala Kammarorkester, conducted by Paul Mägi, Sterling 2008.

References

External links 
Helmer Alexandersson at SFDb 
Recension i Arkivmusic.com

1886 births
1927 deaths
20th-century classical composers
Swedish male classical composers
Male film score composers
Male classical violinists
Musicians from Stockholm
Romantic composers
Royal College of Music, Stockholm alumni
Swedish classical composers
Swedish classical violinists
Swedish film score composers
20th-century classical violinists
20th-century Swedish male musicians
20th-century Swedish musicians